The Chambly Canal is a National Historic Site of Canada in the Province of Quebec, running along the Richelieu River past Saint-Jean-sur-Richelieu, Carignan, and Chambly. Building commenced in 1831 and the canal opened in 1843. It served as a major commercial route during a time of heightened trade between the United States and Canada. Trade dwindled after World War I, and as of the 1970s, traffic has been replaced by recreational vessels.

It is part of a waterway that connects the Saint Lawrence River with the Hudson River in the United States. Lake Champlain and the Champlain Canal form the U.S. portion of the Lakes to Locks Passage.

The Canal has 10 bridges—8 of which are hand operated—and nine hydraulic locks.

 Draft: 
 Clearance: 
 Canal Length: 
 Dimensions of smallest lock: 
 Passage time: 3 to 5 hours

Gallery

References

External links

Official website

Canals in Quebec
National Historic Sites in Quebec
Chambly, Quebec
Transport in Montérégie
Buildings and structures in Montérégie
Tourist attractions in Montérégie
History of Montérégie
Canals opened in 1843
1843 establishments in Canada
Le Haut-Richelieu Regional County Municipality
La Vallée-du-Richelieu Regional County Municipality